Richard Kayne may refer to:

Richard S. Kayne, American professor of linguistics since 1969
Richard Kayne (investor), American private equity billionaire and philanthropist since 1970s

See also
Richard Kane (1662–1736), Irish soldier who served in British Army on Minorca
Richard Rutledge Kane (1877–1958), British Commissioner of Solomon Islands Protectorate